Salt is a novel by British science fiction author Adam Roberts.

Plot
Two communities of settlers from Earth set out for the planet of Salt, but once on the planet, which has minimal natural resources, the two colonies – the Senaar and the Als – descend into war over old tensions. The events of the novel are alternately narrated by Barlei, a military dictator beholden to the Senaar's strict hierarchy, and Petja, an Alsist who grows to resist the Senaar military campaign.

Critical reception

Reviewing the novel for Infinity Plus, Stuart Carter writes, "Doris Lessing and Iain Banks collaborate to rewrite The Dispossessed, and do a better job of it than anyone might reasonably hope! OK, so it's not exactly a blockbuster by-line but, please, trust me on this one—Salt is a moving, intelligent and great book." He adds that Petja and Barlei

Greg L. Johnson, at SF Site, writes:

John C. Snider, reviewing for SciFiDimensions, writes, "It's not just that these two parties don't see eye-to-eye—it's that their cultures are so alien to one another they don't know how to see eye-to-eye. The story of Salt is told, Rashomon-like, through dueling oral histories. ... The reader is forced to interpret these opposing viewpoints, to piece together the 'real' truth if he or she can. And like 'real' life, the reader will find that there are no easy answers and no neat endings."

Awards and nominations
Shortlisted for the 2001 Arthur C. Clarke Award.

See also
Adam Roberts
Gradisil

References

External links 

2000 British novels
2000 science fiction novels
British science fiction novels
Works by Adam Roberts (British writer)
Victor Gollancz Ltd books